Copenhagen Harbor by Moonlight is a mid-19th century painting by Norwegian artist Johan Christian Dahl. Done in oil on canvas, the painting depicts the Copenhagen waterfront at night. The painting is in the collection of the Metropolitan Museum of Art.

Description 
A renowned painter of landscapes, Johan Christian Dahl painted a number of harbor landscapes at night. Dahl painted Copenhagen's harbor at night at least twice, first in 1816 and later in 1846. The second painting - significantly larger than the first - depicts Larsens Plads, an important waterfront in Copenhagen.

References 

1846 paintings
Paintings in the collection of the Metropolitan Museum of Art
Paintings by Johan Christian Dahl
Copenhagen in art